Bhitali Das (6 June 1969 – 21 April 2021) was an Indian singer.

She sang over 5,000 Bihu songs with various artists including Zubeen Garg, Anindita Paul, Tarali Sarma etc. She made several Bihusuriya albums.

Early life 
Bitali Das was born at Majgaon, North Guwahati. She studied in the Senairam Higher Secondary and Multipurpose School.

Career 
 Bhitali Das sung more than 3000 Assamese song with singer Zubeen Garg. Bhitali Das's popular album include Jonbai, Rangdhali, Bogitora, and Enajori.

Death 
On 14 April 2020, Bhitali Das was infected with COVID-19 and was admitted to Guwahati's Kalapahar COVID care centre. On 21 April, she was in a critical condition from complications of COVID-19 and shifted to the Intensive Care Unit (ICU).

Bhitali Das died aged 51 on 21 April at the Kalapahar COVID care centre.

References

1969 births
2021 deaths
20th-century Indian women singers
20th-century Indian singers
Indian pop singers
Indian folk-pop singers
Indian women pop singers
Performers of Hindu music
Singers from Assam
People from Kamrup district
Deaths from the COVID-19 pandemic in India
21st-century Indian women singers
21st-century Indian singers